Henry Grinnell (February 18, 1799 – June 30, 1874) was an American merchant and philanthropist.

Early life
Grinnell was born in New Bedford, Massachusetts on February 18, 1799.  He was the son of Cornelius Grinnell (1758–1850) and Sylvia (née Howland) Grinnell (1765–1837).  His siblings included Joseph Grinnell and Moses Hicks Grinnell.

After graduating from the New Bedford Academy, Grinnell moved to New York City in 1818, where he became a clerk in the commission house of H.D. & E.B. Sewell.

Career
In 1825, Henry joined his older brother Joseph (who later served as member of the U.S. House of Representatives for Massachusetts) and Preserved Fish in Fish, Grinnell & Company.  A few years later, with the addition of Henry's brother-in-law, Robert Bowne Minturn, the firm became Grinnell, Minturn & Company, whose operations were greatly expanded by its entry into the general shipping business.

The company became one of the strongest and best known mercantile houses in New York City.

Arctic exploration
Henry Grinnell retired in 1850, around the time that he became very interested in the fate of the lost Franklin Polar Expedition.  For the remainder of his life he corresponded regularly with Lady Jane Franklin and others interested in solving the mystery, as well as promoting and funding several expeditions.

The first of these expeditions was in 1850, when he purchased and loaned to the United States Navy the brigs Rescue and Advance to search the Arctic under the overall command of Lieutenant Edwin De Haven.  After these vessels returned unsuccessful, he funded a second expedition with the Advance under Elisha Kent Kane which explored the region named Grinnell Land off the north-western coast of Greenland between 1853 and 1855, when the vessel, hopelessly beset in the ice, was abandoned.

In 1856, Grinnell was instrumental in having the recently salvaged HMS Resolute restored at the expense of the United States government, and returned to Great Britain as a good-will gesture.  This was partly in the hope that the vessel would be used for a further search for the Franklin expedition.

On later occasions, Grinnell manifested his unabated interest in polar exploration by contributing to the voyage of Isaac Israel Hayes in 1860, and the three expeditions of Charles Francis Hall between 1860 and 1870. He was also a regular correspondent with the writer and unsuccessful explorer William Parker Snow.

Henry Grinnell was also one of the founders, and the first president, of the American Geographical and Statistical Society. In 1853, he was elected as a member to the American Philosophical Society.

Personal life

On June 12, 1822, Grinnell was married to Sarah Minturn (d. 1881) the daughter of William Minturn Jr. and Sarah (née Bowne) Minturn from the prominent merchant and shipping family. Together, they were the parents of:

 Cornelius Grinnell (1825–1869), who lived in London and died unmarried.
 Sarah Minturn Grinnell (1827–1905), who married Ridley Watts (d. 1892) in 1851.
 Robert Minturn Grinnell (1829–1898), who first married Isabella Musgrave. After her death, he married Sophie Van Alen (d. 1916), sister of Brig. Gen. James Henry Van Alen.
 William Minturn Grinnell (1831–1870), who died unmarried in Arkansas.
 Mary Minturn Grinnell (b. 1834), who died young.
 Henry Howland Grinnell (b. 1836), who also died young.
 Sylvia Howland Grinnell (b. 1838), who married William Fitzherbert Ruxton (born 1830) who became an admiral in the British Royal Navy.
 Mary Minturn Grinnell (1841–1847), who died young.
 Henry Walton Grinnell (1843–1920), who had a distinguished naval career.

Grinnell died on June 30, 1874 and was buried at Green-Wood Cemetery in Brooklyn, New York.  In 1880, the British Government presented his widow with a lady's desk made from timbers from the recently demolished HMS Resolute.  This was not the Resolute desk, but a companion desk made from other timbers from the same vessel.

Descendants
Through his daughter Sarah, he was the grandfather of Frances Sherborne Ridley "Fanny" Watts (b. 1852).  Fanny was a childhood friend of the artist John Singer Sargent, who painted her in 1877. The painting was the first that Sargent submitted to the Paris Salon.

Through his son Robert, he was the grandfather of Josephine Lucy Grinnell (1877–1957), who married Fredrick Harold Van Rensselaer (1874–1903), a grandson of U.S. Representative Henry Bell Van Rensselaer, in 1898.  After his death of cerebro meningitis, she married the actor Harold Rogers Woolf (1880–1953), nephew of Benjamin Edward Woolf, in 1905. They divorced and in 1913, she married Robert Stewart Smith (1875–1944).

Through his daughter Sylvia, he was the grandfather of Sylvia Leith-Ross (1884–1980), who was an anthropologist and writer who worked in Nigeria.

References
Notes

Sources
 Edinger, Ray. Love and Ice: The Tragic Obsessions of Dr. Elisha Kent Kane, Arctic Explorer. Savannah: Frederic C. Beil, Publisher, 2015.
 Henry Grinnell Letters (Grinnell, Henry, 1799–1874) G. W. Blunt White Library, Mystic Seaport
 Loomis, Chauncey C., Weird and Tragic Shores: The Story of Charles Francis Hall, Explorer, New York, Alfred A. Knopf, Inc, 1971.
 McGoogan, Ken (2006). Lady Franklin’s Revenge: A True Story of Ambition, Obsession and the Remaking of Arctic History. London: Bantam Books. .
 Parker Snow, William (1886) Science, trade & humanity combined, personal ideas, plans and labours in connection with such from 1849 to 1886, privately printed 1886.

External links

Portrait photograph

1799 births
1874 deaths
Burials at Green-Wood Cemetery
American businesspeople in shipping
American explorers
American polar explorers
American Geographical Society
19th-century American businesspeople